Anker Beer  is an Indonesian brand of pale lager owned and produced by Delta Djakarta.

External links
Details at Deltajkt.co.id

Beer in Indonesia
Indonesian brands